The 1938 season was Wisła Krakóws 30th year as a club.

Friendlies

Ekstraklasa

Squad, appearances and goals

|-
|}

Goalscorers

External links
1938 Wisła Kraków season at historiawisly.pl

Wisła Kraków seasons
Association football clubs 1938 season
Wisla